The Peenestrom is a river in Mecklenburg-Vorpommern, Germany.  It is 20 kilometres long and is the westernmost connection of the Szczecin Lagoon (together with the Świna and the Dziwna) with the Baltic Sea. It is therefore also one of the three distributaries of the  Oder.

 
Rivers of Mecklenburg-Western Pomerania
Straits of the Baltic Sea
Straits of Germany
Rivers of Germany